AP-7 is a selective NMDA receptor (NMDAR) antagonist that competitively inhibits the glutamate binding site and thus activation of NMDAR. It has anticonvulsant effects.

AP-7 functions specifically as a NMDA recognition site blocker, in contrast with 7-chlorokynurenate, which acts as a glycine site modulation blocker.

Animal studies 
AP-7 injected directly into the dorsal periaqueductal grey (DPAG) of rats produced an anxiolytic effect, whereas direct injection outside of the DPAG did not elicit anxiolytic effects. This suggests that a portion of systemically taken NMDA antagonist's anxiolytic effects comes from the DPAG region of the brain, at least in rats.

The DPAG of the brain is thought to deal with fear-like defensive behavior via NMDA and glycine B receptors. These excitatory glutamate receptors work with the inhibitory GABA receptors to achieve equilibrium in the DPAG of the brain.

AP-7 has been known to cause muscle rigidity and catalepsy in rats following bilateral microinjections (0.02-0.5 nmol) into the globus pallidus and ventral-posterior portions of the caudate-putamen.

The optically pure D-(−)-2-amino-7-phosphonoheptanoic acid [D-AP7], has also been examined. In groups of hypoxia-treated rats, D-AP7 enhanced motility, exhibited anxiogenic-like effect and impaired consolidation in passive avoidance. Both AP-7 and D-AP7 function as potent, specific antagonists of the NMDA receptor.

See also
 APV (drug)

References

NMDA receptor antagonists
Phosphonic acids
Amino acids